Bernardo Caraballo (1 January 1942 – 20 January 2022) was a Colombian boxer, and perennial world title contender, of the 1960s and 70s. He was born in Cartagena.

His name ended up being used for the uncontacted Carabayo people of Amazonas.  

The Coliseo Bernardo Caraballo in Cartagena is named after him.

Professional career
He was the first Colombian to contest a world title. Fights included matches with Fighting Harada, Pascual Pérez, Éder Jofre, and Ernesto Marcel.

Death
Caraballo died from heart disease on 20 January 2022, at the age of 80.

References

1942 births
2022 deaths
Bantamweight boxers
Colombian male boxers
Sportspeople from Cartagena, Colombia